The Bishop Jerome Institute or BJI or BJGI is an institution situated in Kollam city of Kerala, India. It is one among the AICTE approved engineering and management colleges situated inside the city limit of Kollam.

Bishop Jerome Institute is set up in memory of Most Rev. Dr. Jerome M. Fernandez, the first native Bishop of Quilon Diocese, who worked tirelessly for the educational progress of the Catholic community by starting colleges, schools and technical institutions. The college is affiliated to the University of Kerala. The college is from the management of the Bishop Jerome Foundation functioning under the Roman Catholic Diocese of Quilon. It is one among the three architecture colleges in Kollam city. The registration code for college in the university is BJK.

The Architecture students of Bishop Jerome Institute are planning to start a heritage walk for the city of Kollam in the name Kollam Heritage Walk as like the one organized for Trivandrum, by revealing the city's secrets that are concealed in its tiny bylanes, crowded bazaars, places of worship and heritage buildings.

History
Roman Catholic Diocese of Quilon is the first Diocese in India and is known as the Cradle of Indian Christianity. Institutions in Kollam city include Bishop Jerome Nagar Shopping Complex, Fatima Mata National College, Bishop Benziger Hospital, Holy Cross Hospital in Kottiyam, Quilon Social Service Society(QSS), Karmela Rani College etc. Bishop Jerome Institute is their first technical & management educational institution in the city. Bishop Jerome Institute is an integrated institution of three colleges - School of Management(BJSM), School of Architecture and School of Engineering.

The college received approval from the University of Kerala in 2011 just after the completion of its first block. During inception, the college was named as Bishop Jerome Group of Institutions but later they changed it to Bishop Jerome Institute because of some registration issues related with University of Kerala. Salvatore Pennacchio, Apostolic Nuncio to India in-charge has inaugurated the Bishop Jerome Institute (BJI) on 2011 May 14.

Academics

Bishop Jerome Institute offers undergraduate programmes in Architecture and Engineering and masters programme in Business Administration. Admissions to these programs is based on the applicant's results of the entrance tests conducted by the Commissionerate of Entrance Examinations, Kerala.

Engineering courses
 Civil Engineering
 Mechanical Engineering
 Electronics and Communication Engineering
 Electrical and Electronics Engineering
 Architecture

Masters courses
 Master of Business Administration

Facilities and departments
 Department of Civil Engineering
 Department of Mechanical Engineering
 Department of Electronics and Communication Engineering
 Department of Electrical and Electronics Engineering
 Department of Architecture
 Department of Management Studies
 Basic Science Department
 Library
 Engineering & Architecture Laboratories
 Seminar Hall
 Hostels

Alumni Association
The Alumni Association of Bishop Jerome Institute was inaugurated on 25 October 2014. Two batches of MBA students and one batch of Engineering students have passed out from the institution.

Gallery

References

External links 

2011 establishments in Kerala
Engineering colleges in Kollam
Business schools in Kerala